The 1912 LIHG Championship was the first edition of the LIHG Championships. The tournament was held from March 20–24, 1912, in Brussels, Belgium. Germany won the championship, the Oxford Canadians finished second, and Belgium finished third.

Results

Final Table

References

External links
 Tournament on hockeyarchives.info

LIHG Championship
LIHG
LIHG
International ice hockey competitions hosted by Belgium
January 1912 sports events
1912 in Belgian sport